In physics, a redshift is an increase in the wavelength, and corresponding decrease in the frequency and photon energy, of electromagnetic radiation (such as light). The opposite change, a decrease in wavelength and simultaneous increase in frequency and energy, is known as a negative redshift, or blueshift. The terms derive from the colours red and blue which form the extremes of the visible light spectrum.

In astronomy and cosmology, the three main causes of electromagnetic redshift are

 The radiation travels between objects which are moving apart ("relativistic" redshift, an example of the relativistic Doppler effect)
The radiation travels towards an object in a weaker gravitational potential, i.e. towards an object in less strongly curved (flatter) spacetime (gravitational redshift)
The radiation travels through expanding space (cosmological redshift). The observation that all sufficiently distant light sources show redshift for a velocity proportionate to their distance from Earth is known as Hubble's law.

Relativistic, gravitational, and cosmological redshifts can be understood under the umbrella of frame transformation laws. Gravitational waves, which also travel at the speed of light, are subject to the same redshift phenomena.

Examples of strong redshifting are a gamma ray perceived as an X-ray, or initially visible light perceived as radio waves. Subtler redshifts are seen in the spectroscopic observations of astronomical objects, and are used in terrestrial technologies such as Doppler radar and radar guns.

Other physical processes exist that can lead to a shift in the frequency of electromagnetic radiation, including scattering and optical effects; however, the resulting changes are distinguishable from (astronomical) redshift and are not generally referred to as such (see section on physical optics and radiative transfer).

The value of a redshift is often denoted by the letter z, corresponding to the fractional change in wavelength (positive for redshifts, negative for blueshifts), and by the wavelength ratio 1 + z (which is >1 for redshifts, <1 for blueshifts).

History
The history of the subject began with the development in the 19th century of classical wave mechanics and the exploration of phenomena associated with the Doppler effect. The effect is named after Christian Doppler, who offered the first known physical explanation for the phenomenon in 1842. The hypothesis was tested and confirmed for sound waves by the Dutch scientist Christophorus Buys Ballot in 1845. Doppler correctly predicted that the phenomenon should apply to all waves, and in particular suggested that the varying colors of stars could be attributed to their motion with respect to the Earth. Before this was verified, however, it was found that stellar colors were primarily due to a star's temperature, not motion. Only later was Doppler vindicated by verified redshift observations.

The first Doppler redshift was described by French physicist Hippolyte Fizeau in 1848, who pointed to the shift in spectral lines seen in stars as being due to the Doppler effect. The effect is sometimes called the "Doppler–Fizeau effect". In 1868, British astronomer William Huggins was the first to determine the velocity of a star moving away from the Earth by this method. In 1871, optical redshift was confirmed when the phenomenon was observed in Fraunhofer lines using solar rotation, about 0.1 Å in the red. In 1887, Vogel and Scheiner discovered the annual Doppler effect, the yearly change in the Doppler shift of stars located near the ecliptic due to the orbital velocity of the Earth. In 1901, Aristarkh Belopolsky verified optical redshift in the laboratory using a system of rotating mirrors.

Arthur Eddington used the term red shift as early as 1923. The word does not appear unhyphenated until about 1934 by Willem de Sitter.

Beginning with observations in 1912, Vesto Slipher discovered that most spiral galaxies, then mostly thought to be spiral nebulae, had considerable redshifts. Slipher first reports on his measurement in the inaugural volume of the Lowell Observatory Bulletin. Three years later, he wrote a review in the journal Popular Astronomy. In it he states that "the early discovery that the great Andromeda spiral had the quite exceptional velocity of –300 km(/s) showed the means then available, capable of investigating not only the spectra of the spirals but their velocities as well." Slipher reported the velocities for 15 spiral nebulae spread across the entire celestial sphere, all but three having observable "positive" (that is recessional) velocities. Subsequently, Edwin Hubble discovered an approximate relationship between the redshifts of such "nebulae" and the distances to them with the formulation of his eponymous Hubble's law. These observations corroborated Alexander Friedmann's 1922 work, in which he derived the Friedmann–Lemaître equations. In the present day they are considered strong evidence for an expanding universe and the Big Bang theory.

Measurement, characterization, and interpretation

The spectrum of light that comes from a source (see idealized spectrum illustration top-right) can be measured. To determine the redshift, one searches for features in the spectrum such as absorption lines, emission lines, or other variations in light intensity. If found, these features can be compared with known features in the spectrum of various chemical compounds found in experiments where that compound is located on Earth. A very common atomic element in space is hydrogen. The spectrum of originally featureless light shone through hydrogen will show a signature spectrum specific to hydrogen that has features at regular intervals. If restricted to absorption lines it would look similar to the illustration (top right). If the same pattern of intervals is seen in an observed spectrum from a distant source but occurring at shifted wavelengths, it can be identified as hydrogen too. If the same spectral line is identified in both spectra—but at different wavelengths—then the redshift can be calculated using the table below.

Determining the redshift of an object in this way requires a frequency or wavelength range. In order to calculate the redshift, one has to know the wavelength of the emitted light in the rest frame of the source: in other words, the wavelength that would be measured by an observer located adjacent to and comoving with the source. Since in astronomical applications this measurement cannot be done directly, because that would require traveling to the distant star of interest, the method using spectral lines described here is used instead. Redshifts cannot be calculated by looking at unidentified features whose rest-frame frequency is unknown, or with a spectrum that is featureless or white noise (random fluctuations in a spectrum).

Redshift (and blueshift) may be characterized by the relative difference between the observed and emitted wavelengths (or frequency) of an object. In astronomy, it is customary to refer to this change using a dimensionless quantity called . If  represents wavelength and  represents frequency (note,  where  is the speed of light), then  is defined by the equations:

After  is measured, the distinction between redshift and blueshift is simply a matter of whether  is positive or negative. For example, Doppler effect blueshifts are associated with objects approaching (moving closer to) the observer with the light shifting to greater energies. Conversely, Doppler effect redshifts are associated with objects receding (moving away) from the observer with the light shifting to lower energies. Likewise, gravitational blueshifts are associated with light emitted from a source residing within a weaker gravitational field as observed from within a stronger gravitational field, while gravitational redshifting implies the opposite conditions.

Redshift formulae 
In general relativity one can derive several important special-case formulae for redshift in certain special spacetime geometries, as summarized in the following table. In all cases the magnitude of the shift (the value of ) is independent of the wavelength.

Doppler effect

If a source of the light is moving away from an observer, then redshift occurs; if the source moves towards the observer, then blueshift occurs. This is true for all electromagnetic waves and is explained by the Doppler effect. Consequently, this type of redshift is called the Doppler redshift. If the source moves away from the observer with velocity , which is much less than the speed of light, the redshift is given by

     (since )

where  is the speed of light. In the classical Doppler effect, the frequency of the source is not modified, but the recessional motion causes the illusion of a lower frequency.

A more complete treatment of the Doppler redshift requires considering relativistic effects associated with motion of sources close to the speed of light. A complete derivation of the effect can be found in the article on the relativistic Doppler effect. In brief, objects moving close to the speed of light will experience deviations from the above formula due to the time dilation of special relativity which can be corrected for by introducing the Lorentz factor  into the classical Doppler formula as follows (for motion solely in the line of sight):

This phenomenon was first observed in a 1938 experiment performed by Herbert E. Ives and G.R. Stilwell, called the Ives–Stilwell experiment.

Since the Lorentz factor is dependent only on the magnitude of the velocity, this causes the redshift associated with the relativistic correction to be independent of the orientation of the source movement. In contrast, the classical part of the formula is dependent on the projection of the movement of the source into the line-of-sight which yields different results for different orientations. If  is the angle between the direction of relative motion and the direction of emission in the observer's frame (zero angle is directly away from the observer), the full form for the relativistic Doppler effect becomes:

and for motion solely in the line of sight, this equation reduces to:

For the special case that the light is moving at right angle to the direction of relative motion in the observer's frame, the relativistic redshift is known as the transverse redshift, and a redshift:

is measured, even though the object is not moving away from the observer. Even when the source is moving towards the observer, if there is a transverse component to the motion then there is some speed at which the dilation just cancels the expected blueshift and at higher speed the approaching source will be redshifted.

Expansion of space

In the earlier part of the twentieth century, Slipher, Wirtz and others made the first measurements of the redshifts and blueshifts of galaxies beyond the Milky Way. They initially interpreted these redshifts and blueshifts as being due to random motions, but later Lemaître (1927) and Hubble (1929), using previous data, discovered a roughly linear correlation between the increasing redshifts of, and distances to, galaxies. Lemaître realized that these observations could be explained by a mechanism of producing redshifts seen in Friedmann's solutions to Einstein's equations of general relativity. The correlation between redshifts and distances is required by all such models that have a metric expansion of space. As a result, the wavelength of photons propagating through the expanding space is stretched, creating the cosmological redshift.

There is a distinction between a redshift in cosmological context as compared to that witnessed when nearby objects exhibit a local Doppler-effect redshift. Rather than cosmological redshifts being a consequence of the relative velocities that are subject to the laws of special relativity (and thus subject to the rule that no two locally separated objects can have relative velocities with respect to each other faster than the speed of light), the photons instead increase in wavelength and redshift because of a global feature of the spacetime through which they are traveling. One interpretation of this effect is the idea that space itself is expanding. Due to the expansion increasing as distances increase, the distance between two remote galaxies can increase at more than 3 m/s, but this does not imply that the galaxies move faster than the speed of light at their present location (which is forbidden by Lorentz covariance).

Mathematical derivation
The observational consequences of this effect can be derived using the equations from general relativity that describe a homogeneous and isotropic universe.

To derive the redshift effect, use the geodesic equation for a light wave, which is

where
  is the spacetime interval
  is the time interval
  is the spatial interval
  is the speed of light
  is the time-dependent cosmic scale factor
  is the curvature per unit area.

For an observer observing the crest of a light wave at a position  and time , the crest of the light wave was emitted at a time  in the past and a distant position . Integrating over the path in both space and time that the light wave travels yields:

In general, the wavelength of light is not the same for the two positions and times considered due to the changing properties of the metric. When the wave was emitted, it had a wavelength . The next crest of the light wave was emitted at a time

The observer sees the next crest of the observed light wave with a wavelength  to arrive at a time

The right-hand side of the two integral equations above are identical which means

Using the following manipulation:

we find that:

For very small variations in time (over the period of one cycle of a light wave) the scale factor is essentially a constant ( today and  previously). This yields

which can be rewritten as

Using the definition of redshift provided above, the equation

is obtained. In an expanding universe such as the one we inhabit, the scale factor is monotonically increasing as time passes, thus,  is positive and distant galaxies appear redshifted.

Using a model of the expansion of the universe, redshift can be related to the age of an observed object, the so-called cosmic time–redshift relation. Denote a density ratio as :

with  the critical density demarcating a universe that eventually crunches from one that simply expands. This density is about three hydrogen atoms per cubic meter of space. At large redshifts, one finds:

Distinguishing between cosmological and local effects
For cosmological redshifts of  additional Doppler redshifts and blueshifts due to the peculiar motions of the galaxies relative to one another cause a wide scatter from the standard Hubble Law. The resulting situation can be illustrated by the Expanding Rubber Sheet Universe, a common cosmological analogy used to describe the expansion of space. If two objects are represented by ball bearings and spacetime by a stretching rubber sheet, the Doppler effect is caused by rolling the balls across the sheet to create peculiar motion. The cosmological redshift occurs when the ball bearings are stuck to the sheet and the sheet is stretched.

The redshifts of galaxies include both a component related to recessional velocity from expansion of the universe, and a component related to peculiar motion (Doppler shift). The redshift due to expansion of the universe depends upon the recessional velocity in a fashion determined by the cosmological model chosen to describe the expansion of the universe, which is very different from how Doppler redshift depends upon local velocity. Describing the cosmological expansion origin of redshift, cosmologist Edward Robert Harrison said, "Light leaves a galaxy, which is stationary in its local region of space, and is eventually received by observers who are stationary in their own local region of space. Between the galaxy and the observer, light travels through vast regions of expanding space. As a result, all wavelengths of the light are stretched by the expansion of space. It is as simple as that..."

Popular literature often uses the expression "Doppler redshift" instead of "cosmological redshift" to describe the redshift of galaxies dominated by the expansion of spacetime, but the cosmological redshift is not found using the relativistic Doppler equation which is instead characterized by special relativity; thus  is impossible while, in contrast,  is possible for cosmological redshifts because the space which separates the objects (for example, a quasar from the Earth) can expand faster than the speed of light. More mathematically, the viewpoint that "distant galaxies are receding" and the viewpoint that "the space between galaxies is expanding" are related by changing coordinate systems. Expressing this precisely requires working with the mathematics of the Friedmann–Robertson–Walker metric.

If the universe were contracting instead of expanding, we would see distant galaxies blueshifted by an amount proportional to their distance instead of redshifted.

Gravitational redshift

In the theory of general relativity, there is time dilation within a gravitational well. This is known as the gravitational redshift or Einstein Shift. The theoretical derivation of this effect follows from the Schwarzschild solution of the Einstein equations which yields the following formula for redshift associated with a photon traveling in the gravitational field of an uncharged, nonrotating, spherically symmetric mass:

where
  is the gravitational constant,
  is the mass of the object creating the gravitational field,
  is the radial coordinate of the source (which is analogous to the classical distance from the center of the object, but is actually a Schwarzschild coordinate), and
  is the speed of light.

This gravitational redshift result can be derived from the assumptions of special relativity and the equivalence principle; the full theory of general relativity is not required.

The effect is very small but measurable on Earth using the Mössbauer effect and was first observed in the Pound–Rebka experiment. However, it is significant near a black hole, and as an object approaches the event horizon the red shift becomes infinite. It is also the dominant cause of large angular-scale temperature fluctuations in the cosmic microwave background radiation (see Sachs–Wolfe effect).

Observations in astronomy
The redshift observed in astronomy can be measured because the emission and absorption spectra for atoms are distinctive and well known, calibrated from spectroscopic experiments in laboratories on Earth. When the redshift of various absorption and emission lines from a single astronomical object is measured,  is found to be remarkably constant. Although distant objects may be slightly blurred and lines broadened, it is by no more than can be explained by thermal or mechanical motion of the source. For these reasons and others, the consensus among astronomers is that the redshifts they observe are due to some combination of the three established forms of Doppler-like redshifts. Alternative hypotheses and explanations for redshift such as tired light are not generally considered plausible.

Spectroscopy, as a measurement, is considerably more difficult than simple photometry, which measures the brightness of astronomical objects through certain filters. When photometric data is all that is available (for example, the Hubble Deep Field and the Hubble Ultra Deep Field), astronomers rely on a technique for measuring photometric redshifts. However, photometry does at least allow a qualitative characterization of a redshift. Both the photon count rate and the photon energy are redshifted. (See K correction for more details on the photometric consequences of redshift.)

Local observations
In nearby objects (within our Milky Way galaxy) observed redshifts are almost always related to the line-of-sight velocities associated with the objects being observed. Observations of such redshifts and blueshifts have enabled astronomers to measure velocities and parametrize the masses of the orbiting stars in spectroscopic binaries, a method first employed in 1868 by British astronomer William Huggins. Similarly, small redshifts and blueshifts detected in the spectroscopic measurements of individual stars are one way astronomers have been able to diagnose and measure the presence and characteristics of planetary systems around other stars and have even made very detailed differential measurements of redshifts during planetary transits to determine precise orbital parameters. Finely detailed measurements of redshifts are used in helioseismology to determine the precise movements of the photosphere of the Sun. Redshifts have also been used to make the first measurements of the rotation rates of planets, velocities of interstellar clouds, the rotation of galaxies, and the dynamics of accretion onto neutron stars and black holes which exhibit both Doppler and gravitational redshifts. Additionally, the temperatures of various emitting and absorbing objects can be obtained by measuring Doppler broadening—effectively redshifts and blueshifts over a single emission or absorption line. By measuring the broadening and shifts of the 21-centimeter hydrogen line in different directions, astronomers have been able to measure the recessional velocities of interstellar gas, which in turn reveals the rotation curve of our Milky Way. Similar measurements have been performed on other galaxies, such as Andromeda. As a diagnostic tool, redshift measurements are one of the most important spectroscopic measurements made in astronomy.

Extragalactic observations
The most distant objects exhibit larger redshifts corresponding to the Hubble flow of the universe.

The luminous point-like cores of quasars were the first "high-redshift" objects discovered before the improvement of telescopes allowed for the discovery of other high-redshift galaxies.

For galaxies more distant than the Local Group and the nearby Virgo Cluster, but within a thousand megaparsecs or so, the redshift is approximately proportional to the galaxy's distance. This correlation was first observed by Edwin Hubble and has come to be known as Hubble's law. Vesto Slipher was the first to discover galactic redshifts, in about the year 1912, while Hubble correlated Slipher's measurements with distances he measured by other means to formulate his Law. In the widely accepted cosmological model based on general relativity, redshift is mainly a result of the expansion of space: this means that the farther away a galaxy is from us, the more the space has expanded in the time since the light left that galaxy, so the more the light has been stretched, the more redshifted the light is, and so the faster it appears to be moving away from us. Hubble's law follows in part from the Copernican principle. Because it is usually not known how luminous objects are, measuring the redshift is easier than more direct distance measurements, so redshift is sometimes in practice converted to a crude distance measurement using Hubble's law.

Gravitational interactions of galaxies with each other and clusters cause a significant scatter in the normal plot of the Hubble diagram. The peculiar velocities associated with galaxies superimpose a rough trace of the mass of virialized objects in the universe. This effect leads to such phenomena as nearby galaxies (such as the Andromeda Galaxy) exhibiting blueshifts as we fall towards a common barycenter, and redshift maps of clusters showing a fingers of god effect due to the scatter of peculiar velocities in a roughly spherical distribution. This added component gives cosmologists a chance to measure the masses of objects independent of the mass-to-light ratio (the ratio of a galaxy's mass in solar masses to its brightness in solar luminosities), an important tool for measuring dark matter.

The Hubble law's linear relationship between distance and redshift assumes that the rate of expansion of the universe is constant. However, when the universe was much younger, the expansion rate, and thus the Hubble "constant", was larger than it is today. For more distant galaxies, then, whose light has been travelling to us for much longer times, the approximation of constant expansion rate fails, and the Hubble law becomes a non-linear integral relationship and dependent on the history of the expansion rate since the emission of the light from the galaxy in question. Observations of the redshift-distance relationship can be used, then, to determine the expansion history of the universe and thus the matter and energy content.

While it was long believed that the expansion rate has been continuously decreasing since the Big Bang, recent observations of the redshift-distance relationship using Type Ia supernovae have suggested that in comparatively recent times the expansion rate of the universe has begun to accelerate.

Highest redshifts

Currently, the objects with the highest known redshifts are galaxies and the objects producing gamma ray bursts. Slightly less reliable are Lyman-break redshifts, the highest of which is the lensed galaxy A1689-zD1 at a redshift  and the next highest being .

Extremely red objects (EROs) are astronomical sources of radiation that radiate energy in the red and near infrared part of the electromagnetic spectrum. These may be starburst galaxies that have a high redshift accompanied by reddening from intervening dust, or they could be highly redshifted elliptical galaxies with an older (and therefore redder) stellar population. Objects that are even redder than EROs are termed hyper extremely red objects (HEROs).

Such stars are likely to have existed in the very early universe (i.e., at high redshift), and may have started the production of chemical elements heavier than hydrogen that are needed for the later formation of planets and life as we know it.

Redshift surveys

With advent of automated telescopes and improvements in spectroscopes, a number of collaborations have been made to map the universe in redshift space. By combining redshift with angular position data, a redshift survey maps the 3D distribution of matter within a field of the sky. These observations are used to measure properties of the large-scale structure of the universe. The Great Wall, a vast supercluster of galaxies over 500 million light-years wide, provides a dramatic example of a large-scale structure that redshift surveys can detect.

The first redshift survey was the CfA Redshift Survey, started in 1977 with the initial data collection completed in 1982. More recently, the 2dF Galaxy Redshift Survey determined the large-scale structure of one section of the universe, measuring redshifts for over 220,000 galaxies; data collection was completed in 2002, and the final data set was released 30 June 2003. The Sloan Digital Sky Survey (SDSS), is ongoing as of 2013 and aims to measure the redshifts of around 3 million objects. SDSS has recorded redshifts for galaxies as high as 0.8, and has been involved in the detection of quasars beyond . The DEEP2 Redshift Survey uses the Keck telescopes with the new "DEIMOS" spectrograph; a follow-up to the pilot program DEEP1, DEEP2 is designed to measure faint galaxies with redshifts 0.7 and above, and it is therefore planned to provide a high-redshift complement to SDSS and 2dF.

Effects from physical optics or radiative transfer
The interactions and phenomena summarized in the subjects of radiative transfer and physical optics can result in shifts in the wavelength and frequency of electromagnetic radiation. In such cases, the shifts correspond to a physical energy transfer to matter or other photons rather than being by a transformation between reference frames. Such shifts can be from such physical phenomena as coherence effects or the scattering of electromagnetic radiation whether from charged elementary particles, from particulates, or from fluctuations of the index of refraction in a dielectric medium as occurs in the radio phenomenon of radio whistlers. While such phenomena are sometimes referred to as "redshifts" and "blueshifts", in astrophysics light-matter interactions that result in energy shifts in the radiation field are generally referred to as "reddening" rather than "redshifting" which, as a term, is normally reserved for the effects discussed above.

In many circumstances scattering causes radiation to redden because entropy results in the predominance of many low-energy photons over few high-energy ones (while conserving total energy). Except possibly under carefully controlled conditions, scattering does not produce the same relative change in wavelength across the whole spectrum; that is, any calculated  is generally a function of wavelength. If multiple scattering occurs, or the scattering particles have relative motion, then there is generally distortion of spectral lines as well.

In interstellar astronomy, visible spectra can appear redder due to scattering processes in a phenomenon referred to as interstellar reddening—similarly Rayleigh scattering causes the atmospheric reddening of the Sun seen in the sunrise or sunset and causes the rest of the sky to have a blue color. This phenomenon is distinct from redshifting because the spectroscopic lines are not shifted to other wavelengths in reddened objects and there is an additional dimming and distortion associated with the phenomenon due to photons being scattered in and out of the line of sight.

Blueshift

The opposite of a redshift is a blueshift. A blueshift is any decrease in wavelength (increase in energy), with a corresponding increase in frequency, of an electromagnetic wave. In visible light, this shifts a color towards the blue end of the spectrum.

Doppler blueshift 

Doppler blueshift is caused by movement of a source towards the observer. The term applies to any decrease in wavelength and increase in frequency caused by relative motion, even outside the visible spectrum. Only objects moving at near-relativistic speeds toward the observer are noticeably bluer to the naked eye, but the wavelength of any reflected or emitted photon or other particle is shortened in the direction of travel.

Doppler blueshift is used in astronomy to determine relative motion:
 The Andromeda Galaxy is moving toward our own Milky Way galaxy within the Local Group; thus, when observed from Earth, its light is undergoing a blueshift.
 Components of a binary star system will be blueshifted when moving towards Earth
 When observing spiral galaxies, the side spinning toward us will have a slight blueshift relative to the side spinning away from us (see Tully–Fisher relation).
 Blazars are known to propel relativistic jets toward us, emitting synchrotron radiation and bremsstrahlung that appears blueshifted.
 Nearby stars such as Barnard's Star are moving toward us, resulting in a very small blueshift.
 Doppler blueshift of distant objects with a high z can be subtracted from the much larger cosmological redshift to determine relative motion in the expanding universe.

Gravitational blueshift 

Unlike the relative Doppler blueshift, caused by movement of a source towards the observer and thus dependent on the received angle of the photon, gravitational blueshift is absolute and does not depend on the received angle of the photon:

It is a natural consequence of conservation of energy and mass–energy equivalence, and was confirmed experimentally in 1959 with the Pound–Rebka experiment. Gravitational blueshift contributes to cosmic microwave background (CMB) anisotropy via the Sachs–Wolfe effect: when a gravitational well evolves while a photon is passing, the amount of blueshift on approach will differ from the amount of gravitational redshift as it leaves the region.

Blue outliers 
There are faraway active galaxies that show a blueshift in their [O III] emission lines.  One of the largest blueshifts is found in the narrow-line quasar, PG 1543+489, which has a relative velocity of -1150 km/s.  These types of galaxies are called "blue outliers".

Cosmological blueshift
In a hypothetical universe undergoing a runaway Big Crunch contraction, a cosmological blueshift would be observed, with galaxies further away being increasingly blueshifted—the exact opposite of the actually observed cosmological redshift in the present expanding universe.

See also
 Cosmic crystallography
 Gravitational potential
 Relativistic Doppler effect

References

Sources

Articles
 Odenwald, S. & Fienberg, RT. 1993; "Galaxy Redshifts Reconsidered" in Sky & Telescope Feb. 2003; pp31–35 (This article is useful further reading in distinguishing between the 3 types of redshift and their causes.)
 Lineweaver, Charles H. and Tamara M. Davis, "Misconceptions about the Big Bang", Scientific American, March 2005. (This article is useful for explaining the cosmological redshift mechanism as well as clearing up misconceptions regarding the physics of the expansion of space.)

Books
 
 
 
 
 
 
 
 
 
 
 See also physical cosmology textbooks for applications of the cosmological and gravitational redshifts.

External links

 Ned Wright's Cosmology tutorial
 Cosmic reference guide entry on redshift
 Mike Luciuk's Astronomical Redshift tutorial
 Animated GIF of Cosmological Redshift by Wayne Hu
 

Astronomical spectroscopy
Doppler effects
Effects of gravitation
Physical cosmology
Physical quantities
Concepts in astronomy